An election to Limerick City Council took place on 5 June 2009 as part of that year's Irish local elections. 17 councillors were elected from three electoral divisions by PR-STV voting for a five-year term of office.

Results by party

Results by Electoral Area

Limerick City East

Limerick City North

Limerick City South

External links

2009 Irish local elections
2009